The Pelegrin Tarragon is a Latvian ultralight aircraft that is produced by Pelegrin Limited of Ādaži, introduced in 2010. The aircraft is supplied complete and ready-to-fly.

Design and development
Named for the herb, the Tarragon was developed from the Millennium Master after the manufacturer of that design went bankrupt. The Tarragon has been developed by Pelegrin in conjunction with CFM Air.

The Tarragon was designed to comply with the Fédération Aéronautique Internationale microlight rules. It features a cantilever low-wing, an enclosed cockpit with two-seats-in-tandem under a bubble canopy, retractable tricycle landing gear and a single engine in tractor configuration.

The Tarragon's airframe is made from pre-preg carbon fibre composites. Its  span wing mounts flaps. Standard engines available are the  EPA Power SA-R917TNi ULM, the  Rotax 912ULS and Rotax 912iS, the turbocharged  Rotax 914, the  Rotax 915 iS and the  EPA Power SA917Ti Turbo Injection four-stroke powerplants.

In mid-2014 the Latvian ultralight certification was pending.

Operators

Latvian Air Force - two acquired in late 2022 for training.

Specifications (Tarragon)

See also
Blackshape Prime, another design derived from the Millennium Master

References

External links

Tarragon
2010s Latvian ultralight aircraft
Single-engined tractor aircraft